April Matson (born March 13, 1981) is an American actress and singer.  She is known for her portrayal of  Lori Trager on the ABC Family cable television network series Kyle XY. She was also featured on the Fox network television series Quintuplets alongside Andy Richter, and in the 2005 film short Forsaken.

Matson was raised in Lake Elsinore, California.  She trained at the Elsinore Theatre and the American Academy of Dramatic Arts; she also studied sketch comedy at The Second City troupe's school in Los Angeles. Matson has performed in numerous theatrical productions, a rejected pilot for MTV and several independent films. In 2003, Matson made a guest appearance on American Dreams. 

She is also a singer, and had two songs featured in episodes of Kyle XY. The first song is called "Will You Remember Me (Lori's Song)" and was played in the season two episode "Does Kyle Dream of Electric Fish?". A non-acoustic version of this song is available on the Kyle XY soundtrack album. The other song is called "Right In Front Of Me," which was featured in the season two finale, "I've Had the Time of My Life." Matson released a debut album called Pieces of My Heart.

Matson recently played April Johnson on the Idaho-based web series The Gratitude Clan and Crystal in the 2015 mystery-thriller Primrose Lane.

Currently living in Idaho, she founded PLATFORM, a company designed for creative individuals to collaborate on ideas, in December 2015. She's also the office manager for AnchorPoint Accounting, according to her LinkedIn page.

Discography

Kyle XY Soundtrack- released May 22, 2007 
14. Will You Remember Me (Lori's Song) (3:04)  

Pieces of My Heart- EP- released May 10, 2008 on Myspace, released July 9, 2008 on iTunes

1. Pieces of My Heart  (3:47)
2. Don't Crucify Me (3:41) 
3. 99 Miles To San Francisco (Featuring The Brandon James) (3:22) 
4. I Don't Want To Be Strong (2:44) 
5. Dear Jeanine (3:23)

Filmography

Television

Films

References

External links

Article on April Matson's early career from the Scripps Howard News Service
April Matson Interview at DaemonsTV.com

American television actresses
1981 births
Living people
21st-century American actresses